Live at the Wiltern is the second video release by American rock band The All-American Rejects, recorded at the Wiltern Theatre in Los Angeles on December 2, 2005 and released April 20, 2006.

Released as a promotion by American Eagle Outfitters, the video album was offered as a free gift to customers if they spent $75 or more in store.

Concert setlist

Crew
Excutieve producers – Jason B. Bergh, Jon-Marc Sandifer
Director and producer – Jason B. Bergh
Editing – Jason B. Bergh, Matt Pappas
Camera operator – Matt Pappas

References
 Info

External links
 "Top of the World" Performance at the Wiltern Theater

The All-American Rejects video albums
2006 video albums
Live video albums
2006 live albums
Albums recorded at the Wiltern Theatre